This is a list of the 2022 Professional Darts Corporation calendar of events held between January to April, with player progression documented from the quarterfinals stage where applicable.

The list includes European tour events, Players Championships events, World Series of Darts events and PDC majors. It also includes PDC secondary tours (Challenge Tour, Development Tour, and Women's Series) as well as PDC affiliate tours (Championship Dart Circuit, Dart Players Australia, Dart Players New Zealand, PDC Asia, EuroAsian Darts Corporation, and PDC Nordic & Baltic) and PDC qualifying events.

January

February

March

April

See also
List of players with a 2022 PDC Tour Card
2022 PDC Pro Tour

References

External links
Professional Darts Corporation Ltd. – official website

Professional Darts Corporation
2022 in darts